Gild the Lily is the second and to date final studio album by Australian group Chantoozies. The album was released in April 1991 by Mushroom Records and peaked at number 71 on the ARIA Charts.

Track listing
 LP (L 30249)

An outtake from the sessions, a cover of the Jackson 5's "I'll Be There", was released as a single on 23 September 1991, with "Who Cares" as the B-side. This was the Chantoozies' final release during their original run. A second outtake, a cover of The Angels' "My Boyfriend's Back", was included on the soundtrack to the 1990 film The Crossing.

Charts

References

1991 albums
Mushroom Records albums
Chantoozies albums